Sonora State Highway 40 (Carretera Estatal 40) is a highway in the north-west of the Mexican state of Sonora.

It runs from San Luis Rio Colorado to Golfo de Santa Clara.

References

040